Racial or ethnic misrepresentation occurs when someone deliberately misrepresents their racial or ethnic background. It may occur for a variety of reasons, such as someone attempting to benefit from affirmative action programs for which they are not eligible.

Critical race theory examines how people of European descent are, in recent history, more likely to pretend to be people of color. However, historically, many people of color passed as white for survival and safety. It is possible for a person of any race or ethnicity to misrepresent themselves or be misrepresented.

Often racial misrepresentation occurs when people of one race or ethnicity, unfamiliar with real people of another culture, replicate the racial stereotypes of that racial or ethnic group. Typically, this is seen as offensive when negative racial stereotypes are mimicked, but it can be also be experienced as inappropriate even when the imitation is intended as flattery. An example of this is people wearing culturally insensitive Halloween costumes that depict these stereotypes.

Notable cases
 H. G. Carrillo
 Asa Earl Carter
 Ward Churchill
 "Iron Eyes" Cody
 Rachel Dolezal
 Jimmie Durham
 Anita Florence Hemmings
 Jamake Highwater
 Margaret B. Jones (Margaret Seltzer)
 Jessica Krug
 Nasdijj (Timothy Patrick Barrus)
 Merle Oberon
 Grey Owl
 Korla Pandit
 Andrea Smith
Mary Ellen Turpel-Lafond
 Elizabeth Warren

See also
 Cultural appropriation
 Passing (race)
 Pretendian
 Transracial (identity)
 Stereotypes of Indigenous peoples of Canada and the United States

References

Race-related controversies
Academic scandals
History of racism in the United States
Impostors
Racial hoaxes
Hoaxes in the United States